The Skagit Valley Herald is a daily newspaper serving Skagit County, Washington. The paper was founded in 1884 as The Skagit News, a weekly newspaper. In 1913, it was renamed Mount Vernon Herald and transitioned to daily circulation in 1922. It has been known as Skagit Valley Herald since 1956. The current publisher is Heather Hernandez.

In 1964, the paper was sold to the newly-created Skagit Valley Publishing Co., which was affiliated with Scripps League Newspapers and had controlling interest of Pioneer News Group. In 2017, Pioneer sold its papers to Adams Publishing Group.

Skagit Valley Publishing also publishes the weekly Anacortes American, Fidalgo This Week, The Argus, Stanwood Camano News, and Courier-Times.

References

Further reading 

 
 
 

Skagit County, Washington